The Schooner Exchange v. M'Faddon, 11 U.S. (7 Cranch) 116 (1812), is a United States Supreme Court case on the jurisdiction of federal courts over a claim against a friendly foreign military vessel visiting an American port. The court interpreted customary international law to determine that there was no jurisdiction.

Background
The schooner Exchange, owned by John McFaddon and William Greetham, sailed from Baltimore, Maryland, on October 27, 1809, for San Sebastián, Spain. On December 30, 1810, the Exchange was seized by order of Napoleon Bonaparte. The Exchange was then armed and commissioned as a French warship, under the name of Balaou. When the vessel later docked in Philadelphia because of storm damage, McFaddon and Greetham filed an action in the United States Court for the District of Pennsylvania to seize the vessel, claiming that it had been taken illegally.  The district court found that it did not have jurisdiction over the dispute. On appeal, the Circuit Court for the District of Pennsylvania reversed the decision of the district court and ordered the district court to proceed to the merits of the case.

Decision
The Supreme Court reversed the circuit court's decision and affirmed the district court's dismissal of the action.

Chief Justice Marshall delivered the opinion of the Supreme Court. He noted that by the definition of sovereignty, a state has absolute and exclusive jurisdiction within its own territory but it could also, by implied or express consent, waive jurisdiction.  Moreover, Marshall also noted that, under customary international law, jurisdiction was presumed to be waived in a number of situations.

For instance, visiting foreign sovereigns and their diplomatic representatives were generally free from the jurisdiction of domestic courts. Similarly, a state granting permission for a foreign army free passage across its territory generally implied a waiver of jurisdiction over that army. That custom was established so firmly and necessarily for international relations that it would be wrongful for a country to violate it without prior notice.

Marshall further noted that while the right of free passage by an army usually had to be explicitly granted (likely because such passage inevitably involves physical damage of some sort), by maritime custom, a nation's ports were presumptively open to all friendly ships. While a nation could close its ports to the warships of another country, it would have to issue some form of declaration to do so.  Without such a declaration, a friendly foreign warship could enter a nation's port with its implied consent. Marshall further distinguished the difference between private merchant ships and citizens, who are subject to a nation's jurisdiction when they enter its ports with the nation's implied consent, and military ships. Namely, private ships do not carry with them the sovereign status of military ships and the privileges that accompany it.

Therefore, Marshall concluded that "a principle of public [international] law [is] that national ships of war, entering the port of a friendly power open for their reception, are to be considered as exempted by the consent of that power from its jurisdiction."

Applying that analysis to the facts at hand, Marshall found that the courts did not have jurisdiction over the case.

Significance
The decision is regarded as the "first definitive statement of the doctrine of foreign state immunity." Also, the unwillingness of the Court to find jurisdiction without action by the political branches of government, along with some explicit dicta, led to a tradition of great deference by the courts to official and individual determinations of immunity by the US State Department. That system was not revised in favor of judicial interpretations until the passage of the Foreign Sovereign Immunities Act in 1976.

See also
List of United States Supreme Court cases, volume 11

References

Sources

External links
 Text of Case Report

1812 in United States case law
United States Constitution Article Three case law
United States Supreme Court cases
United States admiralty case law
United States Commerce Clause case law
France–United States relations
1812 in international relations
United States foreign sovereign immunity case law
United States Supreme Court cases of the Marshall Court